Święcko is a village in the administrative district of Gmina Kłodzko, within Kłodzko County, Lower Silesian Voivodeship, in south-western Poland.

The village has a population of 253.

History
In the Middle Ages the area was at various times under Bohemian and Polish rule, and later on it also fell to Prussia and Germany. In 1945, following Germany's defeat in World War II, the region became again part of Poland.

Transport
Voivodeship road 381 (road of regional importance) runs through the village, and its intersection with Voivodeship road 386 is located just south of the village.

References

Villages in Kłodzko County